Don Libes is a computer scientist at NIST performing computer science research on interoperability.  He works in the Manufacturing Systems Integration Division, which performs research on software integration methods, creating custom software that implements draft standards and serves as an interface to other components provided by separate vendors.

Libes is responsible for numerous implementations of STEP, a family of ISO standards and draft standards for product management.  He is the creator of the NIST Identifier Collaboration Service, a free service to allow collaborative management of unmanaged namespaces.  Libes is also responsible for one of the earliest network-shared memory ports on UNIX and the first port of XINU on UNIX.

Libes's book Obfuscated C Code and Other Mysteries explains the winning entries in the Obfuscated C Code Contest, as an educational tool.

Libes is best known for Expect, which is public domain software for automating and testing interactive applications such as Telnet, FTP, passwd and hundreds of other programs that have no internal control language (or too limited of a control language) of their own.  Libes also developed Expectk, which glues Expect to Tk thereby allowing a character-graphic or line-oriented program to be entirely hidden with a modern graphical user interface.

Expect has been successively ported to Perl(expect.pm), Python(pexpect) and Java(expect4j): the aforementioned ports are all open source and are as such subject to caution concerning their conformity to Libes' original software.  Massive network automation with the original language or these variants is patent within many ISP's autonomous systems worldwide - the tectonic plates of the Internet, and also within large national and international corporate networks.

Publications

Books

References

American computer scientists
Computer systems researchers
Living people
Year of birth missing (living people)